Narlıkuyu (in Turkish) is a small coastal town in Mersin Province, Turkey.

History 
 
A small 4th century building, once part of a bath and baptism complex financed by Poimenios of Corycus, survives to the present in the area (see Narlıkuyu Museum).

The name of the area was recorded as Porto Calamie ( in Italian) by Italian cartographers during the 15th century. The earliest modern record of the settlement has been made by the Turkish Statistical Institute in 1980 as Narlıdere. Previously the settlement consisted of a deserted bay and a few houses, but in 1994 the municipal organization was established under the name of Narlıkuyu.

Geography 
It is a part of Silifke district which is in turn a part of Mersin Province. It is on the Mersin Antalya highway between two districts of Mersin; Erdemli and Silifke.

The town has many popular fishing restaurants, located around a small bay famous for its unusually cool and fresh water, fed by underground freshwater streams.

Administration 
The township was established in 1994 with the fusion of several small villages. The population is 2725 (2012 est.)

See also 
Cennet and Cehennem

References and notes 

Populated places in Mersin Province
Populated coastal places in Turkey
Seaside resorts in Turkey
Towns in Turkey
Archaeological sites in Mersin Province, Turkey
Populated places in Silifke District